George Keppel may refer to:

George Keppel, 3rd Earl of Albemarle (1724–1772), British general, MP for Chichester
George Keppel (Royal Navy officer),  a captain of HMS Ardent (1778)
George Keppel, 6th Earl of Albemarle (1799–1891), British general, MP for East Norfolk and Lymington
George Keppel (British Army officer, born 1865) (1865–1947), British soldier and husband of Alice Keppel, the mistress of King Edward VII

See also
George Roos-Keppel (1866–1921), British soldier, Chief Commissioner of Khyber-Pakhtunkhwa